In algebra, a triple system (or ternar) is a vector space V over a field F together with a F-trilinear map

The most important examples are Lie triple systems and Jordan triple systems. They were introduced by Nathan Jacobson in 1949 to study subspaces of associative algebras closed under triple commutators [[u, v], w] and triple anticommutators {u, {v, w}}. In particular, any Lie algebra defines a Lie triple system and any Jordan algebra defines a Jordan triple system. They are important in the theories of symmetric spaces, particularly Hermitian symmetric spaces and their generalizations (symmetric R-spaces and their noncompact duals).

Lie triple systems

A triple system is said to be a Lie triple system if the trilinear map, denoted , satisfies the following identities:

The first two identities abstract the skew symmetry and Jacobi identity for the triple commutator, while the third identity means that the linear map Lu,v: V → V, defined by Lu,v(w) = [u, v, w], is a derivation of the triple product. The identity also shows that the space k = span {Lu,v : u, v ∈ V} is closed under commutator bracket, hence a Lie algebra.

Writing m in place of V, it follows that

can be made into a -graded Lie algebra, the standard embedding of m, with bracket

The decomposition of g is clearly a symmetric decomposition for this Lie bracket, and hence if G is a connected Lie group with Lie algebra g and K is a subgroup with Lie algebra k, then G/K is a symmetric space.

Conversely, given a Lie algebra g with such a symmetric decomposition (i.e., it is the Lie algebra of a symmetric space), the triple bracket [[u, v], w] makes m into a Lie triple system.

Jordan triple systems

A triple system is said to be a Jordan triple system if the trilinear map, denoted {.,.,.}, satisfies the following identities:

The first identity abstracts the symmetry of the triple anticommutator, while the second identity means that if Lu,v:V→V is defined by  Lu,v(y) = {u, v, y} then

so that the space of linear maps span {Lu,v:u,v ∈ V} is closed under commutator bracket, and hence is a Lie algebra g0.

Any Jordan triple system is a Lie triple system with respect to the product

A Jordan triple system is said to be positive definite (resp. nondegenerate) if the bilinear form on V defined by the trace of Lu,v is positive definite (resp. nondegenerate). In either case, there is an identification of V with its dual space, and a corresponding involution on g0. They induce an involution of

which in the positive definite case is a Cartan involution. The corresponding symmetric space is a symmetric R-space. It has a noncompact dual given by replacing the Cartan involution by its composite with the involution equal to +1 on g0 and −1 on V and V*. A special case of this construction arises when g0 preserves a complex structure on V. In this case we obtain dual Hermitian symmetric spaces of compact and noncompact type (the latter being bounded symmetric domains).

Jordan pair

A Jordan pair is a generalization of a Jordan triple system involving two vector spaces V+ and V−. The trilinear map is then replaced by a pair of trilinear maps

which are often viewed as quadratic maps V+ → Hom(V−, V+) and V− → Hom(V+, V−). The other Jordan axiom (apart from symmetry) is likewise replaced by two axioms, one being

and the other being the analogue with + and − subscripts exchanged.

As in the case of Jordan triple systems, one can define, for u in V− and v in V+, a linear map

and similarly L−. The Jordan axioms (apart from symmetry) may then be written

which imply that the images of L+ and L− are closed under commutator brackets in End(V+) and End(V−). Together they determine a linear map

whose image is a Lie subalgebra , and the Jordan identities become Jacobi identities for a graded Lie bracket on

so that conversely, if

is a graded Lie algebra, then the pair  is a Jordan pair, with brackets

Jordan triple systems are Jordan pairs with V+ = V− and equal trilinear maps. Another important case occurs when V+ and V− are dual to one another, with dual trilinear maps determined by an element of

See also
Associator
Quadratic Jordan algebra

References

 
 

 
 .
 .
 
 
 
 
 

 
 

Representation theory